The Lusatian culture existed in the later Bronze Age and early Iron Age (1700 BC – 500 BC) in most of what is now Poland and parts of the Czech Republic, Slovakia, eastern Germany and western Ukraine. It covers the Periods Montelius III (early Lusatian culture) to V of the Northern European chronological scheme.

There were close contacts with the Nordic Bronze Age. Hallstatt and La Tène influences can also be seen particularly in ornaments (fibulae, pins) and weapons.

Origins

The Lusatian culture developed as the preceding Trzciniec culture experienced influences from the Tumulus culture of the Middle Bronze Age, essentially incorporating the local communities into the socio-political network of Iron Age Europe. It formed part of the Urnfield systems found from eastern France, southern Germany and Austria to Hungary and the Nordic Bronze Age in northwestern Germany and Scandinavia. It was followed by the Billendorf culture of the Early Iron Age in the West. In Poland, the Lusatian culture is taken have spanned part of the Iron Age as well (there is only a terminological difference) and was succeeded in Montelius VIIbc in the northern ranges around the mouth of Vistula by the Pomeranian culture spreading south.

'Lusatian-type' burials were first described by the German pathologist and archaeologist Rudolf Virchow (1821–1902). The name refers to the Lusatia area in eastern Germany (Brandenburg and Saxony) and western Poland. Virchow identified the pottery artifacts as 'pre-Germanic' but refused to speculate on the ethnic identity of their makers. The Polish archeologist Józef Kostrzewski, who started in 1934 to conduct extensive excavations of a Lusatian settlement of Biskupin, hypothesised that the Lusatian culture was a predecessor of later cultures that belonged to the early Slavs. Modern archeologists, such as Kazimierz Godłowski and Piotr Kaczanowski, hold the view that the ethnic geography of Bronze Age Central Europe then included peoples whose languages and ethnic identity are simply unknown.

Culture

Burial was by cremation; inhumations are rare. The urn is usually accompanied by numerous (up to 40) secondary vessels. Metal grave gifts are sparse, but there are numerous hoards (such as Kopaniewo, Pomerania) that contain rich metalwork, both bronze and gold (hoard of Eberswalde, Brandenburg). Graves containing moulds, like at Bataune, Saxony and tuyeres, attest to the production of bronze tools and weapons at the village level. The 'royal' tomb of Seddin, Brandenburg, Germany, covered by a large earthen barrow, contained Mediterranean imports like bronze vessels and glass beads. Cemeteries can be quite large and contain thousands of graves.

Well-known settlements include Biskupin, in Poland, and Buch, near Berlin. There are both open villages and fortified settlements (burgwall or gord) on hilltops or in swampy areas. The ramparts were constructed of wooden boxes filled with soil or stones.

Its economy was mainly based on arable agriculture, as is attested by numerous storage pits. Wheat (emmer) and six-row barley formed the basic crops, together with millet, rye and oats, peas, broad beans, lentils, and gold of pleasure (Camelina sativa). Flax was grown, and remains of domesticated apples, pears, and plums have been found. Cattle and pigs were the most important domestic animals, followed by sheep, goats, horses, and dogs. Pictures on Iron Age urns from Silesia attest horse riding, but horses were used to draw chariots as well. Hunting was practiced, as bones of red and roe deer, boar, bison, elk, hare, fox, and wolf attest, but it did not provide much of the meat consumed. The numerous frog bones found at Biskupin may indicate that frogs' legs were eaten as well.

Gallery

See also 
Lusatia
Urnfield culture
Nordic Bronze Age 
Hallstatt culture
Schweinert burial mounds

References

Further reading
J. M. Coles and A. F. Harding, The Bronze Age in Europe (London 1979).
Dabrowski, J. (1989) Nordische Kreis und Kulturen Polnischer Gebiete. Die Bronzezeit im Ostseegebiet. Ein Rapport der Kgl. Schwedischen Akademie der Literatur-Geschichte und Altertumsforschung über das Julita-Symposium 1986. Ed Ambrosiani, B. Kungl. Vitterhets Historie och Antikvitets Akademien. Konferenser 22. Stockholm.

External links

 Hypothetical reconstruction of a Lusatian culture settlement, raised using only bronze age tools - Wola Radziszowska (near Cracow)- Poland
 Kaliska I: a Late Bronze Age metal hoard from Pomerania (Poland)

Archaeological cultures of Central Europe
Iron Age cultures of Europe
Bronze Age cultures of Europe
Archaeological cultures in the Czech Republic
Archaeological cultures in Germany
Archaeological cultures in Poland
Archaeological cultures in Slovakia
Archaeological cultures in Ukraine
Prehistoric Poland